Commission v Anic Partecipazioni SpA (1999) C-49/92 is an EU competition law case, concerning the requirements for finding that there has been a cartel, or unlawful collusion, within TFEU article 101.

Facts
Anic Partecipazioni SpA and several other corporations (including Montedison, Hoechst, Imperial Chemical Industries and Shell Chemicals) manufactured polypropylene, a substance used in packaging and labelling, some textiles, loudspeakers and polymer banknotes. Between 1977 and 1983 they had a system of target prices, and aimed to limit output to share the market according to quotas. Anic had a market share between 2.7 and 4.2 per cent.

The Commission found that Anic was in the cartel and fined it 750,000 ecu. The Court of First Instance reduced the Commission’s fine, saying the Commission failed to establish correctly how long Anic was involved in the cartel. Anic cross appealed, seeking further fine reduction or full annulment of the Commission’s Decision, arguing the Commission failed to specify whether its alleged infringement was an agreement or a concerted practice.

Judgment
The Court of Justice upheld the General Court’s judgment. It was not necessary to distinguish agreements, decisions and concerted practices, as a long course of conduct could cover any of them. A concerted practice meant knowingly substituting competition with practical cooperation, and an agreement meant an expression of joint intention. But the two were not mutually incompatible.

See also

EU competition law

Notes

References

European Union competition case law
1999 in case law
1999 in the European Union